Éric Vermeulen (born 12 April 1954) is a French former cyclist. He competed in the 1000m time trial event at the 1976 Summer Olympics.

References

External links
 

1954 births
Living people
French male cyclists
Olympic cyclists of France
Cyclists at the 1976 Summer Olympics
Sportspeople from Gironde
Cyclists from Nouvelle-Aquitaine
20th-century French people
21st-century French people